The 1919 Allan Cup was the Canadian senior ice hockey championship for the 1918–19 season.

The series was played in Toronto, Ontario between the Hamilton Tigers and the Winnipeg Selkirks. The Tigers won the Allan Cup for the first and only time. The team played in the 1931 and 1946 finals, but lost both times.

Final
Hamilton Tigers 6 Selkirk 1
Selkirk 5 Hamilton Tigers 1

Hamilton Tigers beat Selkirk on goals differential (7-6).

External links
Allan Cup archives 
Allan Cup website

1918–19 in Canadian ice hockey